Garda Trentino Olympic Week is an annual sailing regatta in Riva del Garda, Italy. It hosts the Olympic and Paralympic classes.

It is part of the 2015 EUROSAF Champions Sailing Cup.

Winners

Men's 470

2015 –  Simon Sivitz Kosuta & Jas Farneti

Men's 49er

2015 –  Ruggi Tita & Giacomo Cavalli

Men's Laser

2015 –  Jean-Baptiste Bernaz

Men's RS:X

2015 –  Daniele Benedetti

Women's 470

2015 –  Tina Mrak & Veronika Macarol

Women's 49er FX

2015 –  Giulia Conti & Francesca Clapcich

Women's Laser Radial

2015 –  Evi Van Acker

Women's RS:X

2015 –  Meg Berenice

Mixed Nacra 17

2015 –  Vittorio Bissaro & Silvia Sicouri

2.4 Metre

2015 –  Antonio Squizzato

Skud 18

2015 –  Alexandra Rickham & Niki Birrel

Sonar

2015 –  Cristiano D'Agaro, Fabrizio Solazzo & Gianbacchisio Pira

References

Annual sporting events in Italy
Sailing competitions in Italy
Sailing regattas
EUROSAF Champions Sailing Cup